Tetela (Otetela, Kitetela, Kikitatela), also Sungu, is a Bantu language of northern Kasai-Oriental Province, Democratic Republic of the Congo. It is spoken by the Tetela people.

Noun classes 
Like other Bantu languages, Tetela grammar arranges nouns into a number of classes. The ancestral system had 22 classes (counting singular and plural as distinct according to the Meinhof system), with most Bantu languages sharing at least ten of them.

{| class=wikitable
!class!!semantics!!prefix!!singular!!translation!!plural!!translation
|-
!1, 2
| persons
| o-/ɔ-/w-, a- || omfúnjí || scribe, secretary || amfúnjí || scribes, secretaries
|-
!3, 4
| trees, etc
| o-/ɔ-/w-, e-/ɛ- || ojja || place || ejja || places; region
|-
!5, 6
| various
| di-/dy-, a- || dihamvú || fruit of Chrysophyllum lacourtianum || ahamvú || fruits of Chrysophyllum lacourtianum
|-
!7, 8
| various
| ke-/e-, di-/dy- || kesashi || chief || disashi || chiefs
|-
! 9, 10
|animals, etc
| Ø-/N-, Ø-/N- || mbódí || goat || mbódí || goats
|-
! 11, 10
| abstract concepts, etc
| lo-, N- || lolémí || language || némí || languages
|-
! 12, 13
| various
| ka-/k-, to-/t- || kashikɛ || helmet (from French casque) || toshikɛ || helmets
|-
! 19, 13
| various
| °i- (complex morphology), to-/t- || jɔ́ndɔ́ || ??? || tɔlɔ́ndɔ́ || ???
|}

References

Relevant literature
 Elysee Meta Okubo. 2016. A COLLECTION OF 100 TETELA PROVERBS. Proverb website
 Mukanga, Ndjeka Elizabeth, Empenge Albert Shefu, Ambaye Albertine Tshefu. 2020. Great Collection of Tetela Proverbs on the African Wisdom. Pittsburgh: Dorrance Publishers. [283 proverbs, 107 pages]

Tetela languages
Languages of the Democratic Republic of the Congo